Beder-Malling is a town in Aarhus Municipality, Central Denmark Region in Denmark, with a population of 9,045 (1 January 2022). Beder-Malling is situated South-east of Mårslet and 6 kilometers South of Aarhus. Beder-Malling is a new town formed when the towns of Beder and Malling merged into one conurbation in the 2010s and it officially became one urban area.

References

External links
 Borum Website
 Local history
 Sabro-Borum

Towns and settlements in Aarhus Municipality
Cities and towns in Aarhus Municipality